The 1960 Carshalton by-election was held on 16 November 1960 when the incumbent Conservative MP, Antony Head, was elevated to the peerage on appointment as British High Commissioner to Nigeria.  It was retained by the Conservative candidate Walter Elliot.

References

Carshalton,1960
Carshalton,1960
Carshalton,1960
Carshalton by-election
Carshalton by-election
20th century in Surrey
Carshalton